Mercedes is a 1933 Spanish romantic comedy film directed by José María Castellví. It was a commercial success on its release. It is now considered a lost film.

Cast
Rafael Arcos
Carmelita Aubert
Juan Bux
Antoñita Colomé 

Héctor Morel
Jaime Planas
José Santpere

References

External links

1933 romantic comedy films
Spanish romantic comedy films
Films directed by José María Castellví
Lost Spanish films
Spanish black-and-white films
1933 lost films
Lost romantic comedy films
1930s Spanish-language films